President Elpidio Quirino Avenue, more commonly known as Quirino Avenue, is a 6-10 lane divided highway in Manila, Philippines. It passes through Paco and Pandacan districts where it also serves as a truck route between Port Area and South Luzon Expressway. North of Nagtahan Bridge, the road continues as Nagtahan Street. It is designated as part of Circumferential Road 2.

Route description
Nagtahan Bridge to Paco-Santa Mesa Road section

The northern end of Quirino Avenue is at the intersection of Paz Mendoza Guazon (Otis) and Jesus Streets in Paco, at the foot of the Nagtahan Bridge as a continuation of Nagtahan. Jesus Street leads to the former Pandacan oil depot to the east while Paz Mendoza Guazon Street leads to Malacañang Park and Robinsons Otis to the west. Heading south, it enters Pandacan moving past primarily residential areas on both sides, meeting the Nagtahan ramps to and from Skyway Stage 3, and passing by Zamora Market on the west side. At Plaza Berde, the avenue then curves southwest following the alignment of the Philippine National Railways line, where it merges with traffic from Paco-Santa Mesa Road (Tomas Claudio Street).

Paco-Santa Mesa Road to Osmeña Highway section

South of the junction with Tomas Claudio, the avenue traverses the district of Paco where the Old Paco station and Plaza Dilao are located. Southbound traffic is currently carried by Plaza Dilao Road, a loop road around Plaza Dilao just off the main highway, while northbound traffic remain on Quirino. Also located along this stretch are the Plaza Dilao on-ramp to Skyway and the Philippine Columbian Association complex on Plaza Dilao and the new Paco railway station near the intersection with Pedro Gil Street. It follows a straight path south towards the border with Malate where it is joined by Osmeña Highway.

Osmeña Highway to Roxas Boulevard section

The Malate section of Quirino Avenue is primarily residential and commercial. The Singalong area lies directly south of the Osmeña Highway junction just before it intersects with Taft Avenue, where the elevated Quirino LRT Station is located. Past Taft Avenue, Quirino provides access to the tourism center of Malate where the Remedios Circle, Manila Zoo, Baywalk, San Andres Sports Complex, Plaza Rajah Sulayman, and Malate Church are located. It curves westwards past Adriatico Street until it meets its southern terminus at Roxas Boulevard near Manila Yacht Club and Ospital ng Maynila Medical Center. A monument of Elpidio Quirino, to whom the avenue is named after, is also located at the intersection.

Quirino Avenue Extension

Quirino Avenue extends to the industrial area of Paco (Otis) and United Nations Avenue from Plaza Dilao Road. Formerly known as Calle Canonigo, this is the main truck route going in and out of Port Area from Osmeña Highway.

History
Its origin dates back to the early 19th century under Spanish rule when the avenue was first laid out as Calle Canonigo in Paco. The road leading to Nagtahan Bridge then was a narrow street called Calle Luengo in Pandacan. The narrow street connecting southern Malate to Cavite Boulevard (now Roxas Boulevard) was a street called Calle Cortabitarte.

Built in the 20th century, the avenue was initially known as Dewey Boulevard (for being an erstwhile continuation and a part of the present-day Roxas Boulevard) and as Harrison Boulevard. It was renamed to Koa Boulevard during the World War II and Japanese occupation in 1942. The whole length of the highway that forms part of Circumferential Road 2 was later named in honor of the sixth President of the Philippines, Elpidio Quirino.

Landmarks

 Aloha Hotel
 Asociacion de Damas de Filipinas
 Bureau of Plant Industry
 Jacinto Zamora Elementary School
 Manila Zoo
 Old Paco railway station
 Ospital ng Maynila Medical Center
 Malacañang Hospital
 Manuel Roxas High School
 Paraiso ng Batang Maynila Park
 Philippine Columbian Association
 Plaza Dilao
 President Elpidio Quirino Monument
 Saint Peter the Apostle School
 San Andres Market
 Zamora Market

Intersections

Quirino Avenue

Quirino Avenue Extension

See also 

Major roads in Manila

References

Streets in Manila
Malate, Manila
Paco, Manila
Pandacan